Ascot United Football Club is a football club based in Ascot, Berkshire, England.

History
The club was founded in 1965. In 2001 they joined the Senior Division of the Reading League, going on to win the league in 2006–07. As a result, the club were promoted to Division One East of the Hellenic League. After finishing fourth in their first season, they claimed the runners-up spot in 2008–09 season, earning promotion to the Premier Division. The club made its debut in the FA Vase in the 2010–11 season and the 2011–12 season saw them play in the FA Cup for the first time. Their first match was against Wembley, which was the first-ever FA Cup match streamed live on Facebook. The game also led to Ascot's then-record attendance of 1,149. In 2013–14 the club won the Hellenic League Challenge Cup, defeating Ardley United 2–1 in the final. The 2018–19 season saw them win the Challenge Cup for a second time with a 3–1 win against Windsor in the final. At the end of the season they were transferred to the Premier Division of the Combined Counties League.

Ground
The club originally played home matches at Sunninghill, but were given permission by the Ascot Racecourse trustees to build a ground on land to the north of a coach park at the racecourse. A clubhouse was built, which was replaced in 1990, and again in 1992. Two years later floodlights were also installed. The ground now has a capacity of 1,150.

Honours
Hellenic League
Challenge Cup winners 2013–14, 2018–19
Reading League
Senior Division champions 2006–07
Reading Evening Post Cup
Winners 2005–06

Records
Best FA Cup performance: Preliminary round, 2012–13, 2014–15, 2021–22
Best FA Vase performance: Semi-finals, 2022–23
Record attendance: 1,267 vs Wycombe Wanderers, Berks & Bucks Senior Cup semi-final, 22 March 2022

See also
Ascot United F.C. players

References

External links
Official website

Association football clubs established in 1965
Football clubs in Berkshire
1965 establishments in England
Football clubs in England
Thames Valley Premier Football League
Hellenic Football League
Combined Counties Football League
Sunninghill and Ascot